Cepheidae may refer to:
 Cepheidae (jellyfish), a family of jellyfish in the order Rhizostomeae
 Cepheidae (mite), a family of mites in the order Sarcoptiformes